Tang Minglin (born 3 February 1998) is a Chinese rugby sevens player. She competed in the women's tournament at the 2020 Summer Olympics.

References

External links
 

1998 births
Living people
Female rugby sevens players
Olympic rugby sevens players of China
Rugby sevens players at the 2020 Summer Olympics
Place of birth missing (living people)
China international women's rugby sevens players